The decade of the 1540s in music (years 1540–1549) involved some significant events.

Events 
1540
4 April – Cristobal Morales leaves the position of master of the choristers at the Chapel of the Papal Basilica in St. Peter's, Rome
23 April – Thomas Tallis loses his job at Waltham Abbey due to the Dissolution of the Monasteries
27 April – Gioseffo Zarlino is elected capellini and mansionario of the Scuola di San Francesco in Chioggia
1 May – Ambrose Lupo is taken on as a musician and composer at the court of Henry VIII
30 December – Jacques Arcadelt is appointed maestro di cappella at the Sistine chapel in Rome
December – Nicolas Gombert dismissed from his position at the court chapel of the Emperor, Charles V
1541
25 May – Cristobal Morales re-joined the Papal choir at St. Peter's, Rome
15 July – Jacques Buus appointed second organist at the basilica of S Marco, Venice
1542
3 April – Francisco Guerrero joined the Seville Cathedral choir as a contralto
1543: Thomas Tallis becomes a Gentleman of the Chapel Royal in England.
20 July Tielman Susato is granted a three-year privilege to print music in the Netherlands.
1544
28 October Giovanni Pierluigi Da Palestrina appointed organist at San Agapito Church, Palestrina
1545
1 May Bartolomeo de Escobedo appointed maestro di cappella at the chapel of the Papal Basilica at St Peter's in Rome.
1 May Cristobal Morales was granted 10 months leave from the Papal Chapel in Rome. He never returned.
31 August Cristobal Morales succeeded Andres de Torrentes as maestro di capilla at Toledo Cathedral.
1547
6 May Waclaw of Szamotuly joined the Chapel Royal of Sigismund II Augustus of Poland in Vilnius.
28 May Jacques Arcadelt reappointed maestro di cappella at the Sistine chapel.
12 June Giovanni Pierluigi da Palestrina marries Lucrezia de Goris in his home town of Palestrina, Lazio
9 August Cristobal Morales leaves the position of maestro di cappella at Toledo Cathedral.
Bologna's first public theatre, the Teatro Della Sala, was opened. It burned down in 1623.
1548 François Roussel appointed maestro di cappella at St. Peter's, Rome
1549 Juan Francisco de Penalosa succeeded Francisca Sacedo as principal organist of Toledo Cathedral
Balint Bakfark appointed court lutenist to King Sigismund Augustus of Poland

Bands formed 
1548: Staatskapelle Dresden formed in Saxony.

Publications

1540
 Sebald Heyden – , third installment, important treatise on singing
 Francesco de Layolle – 25  for five voices (Lyon: Jacques Moderne)
 Hubert Naich –  for four and five voices (Rome: Antonio Blado), a collection of madrigals
 Hans Neusidler –  (Nuremberg: Hans Guldenmundt), a collection of lute music
 Alfonso dalla Viola –  for four voices (Ferrara: Henrico De Campis)
 Claudio Veggio – , published in Venice

1541
 Martin Agricola – Book of Protestant hymns , published in Wittenberg.
 Jhan Gero –  (Venice: Antonio Gardano)
 Nicolas Gombert
Second book of motets for five voices (Venice: Girolamo Scotto)
Second book of motets for four voices (Venice: Girolamo Scotto)
 Giovanni Domenico da Nola – , books 1 and 2, for three voices (Venice: Girolamo Scotto)
 Giordano Passetto – , book 1 (Venice: Antonio Gardano)

1542
 Benedictus Appenzeller –  (Antwerp: Henry Loys & Jehan de Buys), a collection of chansons for 4 voices
 Jacques Arcadelt – First book of madrigals for three voices (Venice: Antonio Gardano), "together with some madrigals by Costanzo Festa along with twelve French chansons and six new motets"
 Pierre Certon
Second book of motets for four voices (Paris: Pierre Attaingnant & Hubert Jullet)
Third book of motets for four voices (Paris: Pierre Attaingnant & Hubert Jullet)
 Domenico Ferrabosco – First book of madrigals for four voices (Venice: Antonio Gardano)
 Silvestro Ganassi dal Fontego – Regola rubertina, Venice
 Johannes Lupi – Third book of motets for four voices (Paris: Pierre Attaingnant & Hubert Jullet), published posthumously
 Cipriano de Rore – First book of madrigals a5.

1543
 Jacques Buus – First book of French chansons for six voices (Venice: Antonio Gardano)
 Sebastian z Felsztyna – Directiones musicae ad cathedralis ecclesia premislensis usum, Kraków
 Silvestro Ganassi dal Fontego – Lettione seconda [=second book of Regola rubertina], Venice
 Balthasar Resinarius – Responsorium numero orctoginta de tempore et festis...libri duo

1544
 Jacques Arcadelt –  for 4 voices (Venice: Antonio Gardano)
 Paolo Aretino –  (Venice: Gerolamo Scotto)
 Jacquet de Berchem – "Ala Dolc'ombra de le Belle Frondi" published by Antonio Gardano in Venice.
 Simon Boyleau – Motets for four voices (Venice: Girolamo Scotto)
 Francesco Corteccia – First book of madrigals for four voices (Venice: Girolamo Scotto)
 Cristóbal de Morales
First book of masses, for four and five voices (Rome: Valerio and Luigi Dorico)
Second book of masses, for four, five, and six voices (Rome: Valerio and Luigi Dorico)
 Georg Rhau –  published in Wittemberg.
 Cipriano de Rore –  for 5 voices published in Venice.
 Tielman Susato (ed.)
Third book of chansons, for four voices (Antwerp: Tielman Susato), contains only compositions by Thomas Crecquillon
Fifth book of chansons, for five and six voices (Antwerp: Tielman Susato), contains mostly compositions by Nicolas Gombert

1545
 Perissone Cambio
Madrigals for five voices (Venice: Antonio Gardano)
 for four voices (Venice: Antonio Gardano)
 Guillaume Le Heurteur – 12 Motets (Paris: Pierre Attaingnant)
 Pierre de Manchicourt – , tome one, for four voices (Paris: Pierre Attaingnant), a collection of motets
 Gian Domenico del Giovane da Nola –  for four voices (Venice)
 Cipriano de Rore – Motets for five voices
 Vincenzo Ruffo –  for four voices published in Venice
 Tielman Susato (ed.)
Ninth book of chansons, for four voices (Antwerp: Tielman Susato), contains only compositions by Pierre de Manchicourt
 The Lutheran hymnal Geistliche Lieder published by Valentin Babst in Leipzig

1546
 Giovan Thomaso di Maio – , book 1.

1547
 Giovanni Animuccia – First book of madrigals for 4, 5, and 6 voices (Venice: Antonio Gardano)
 Loys Bourgeois – First book of four-part psalms (Lyon: Godfroy & Marcelin Beringen frères), published for the Calvinists of Geneva using the French translations by Clément Marot.
 Jacques Buus – First book of ricercars for four voices or instruments (Venice: Antonio Gardano)
 Perissone Cambio – First book of madrigals for four voices (Venice: Antonio Gardano), also includes a few madrigals by Cipriano de Rore
 Francesco Corteccia
New expanded edition of the first book of madrigals for four voices, including pieces composed for intermedii for the comedy  by Francesco d'Ambra (Venice: Antonio Gardano)
Second book of madrigals for four voices (Venice: Antonio Gardano)
First book of madrigals for five and six voices (Venice: Antonio Gardano)
 Claude Gervaise, ed. – Second book of dances for four instruments (Paris: Pierre Attaingnant)
 Heinrich Glarean – Dodecachordon published in Basel.
 Hoste da Reggio – First book of madrigals for four voices (Venice: Antonio Gardano)
 Hans Neusidler – 
 Caspar Othmayr
 (Nuremberg: Johann Berg and Ulrich Neuber)
 for five voices (Nuremberg: Johann Berg and Ulrich Neuber), a collection of motets
 Dominique Phinot – First book of motets for five voices (Lyon: Godefroy & Marcellin Beringen)
 Enriquez de Valderrabano – Book of vihuela music  published in Valladolid

1548
 Benedictus Appenzeller – A collection of sacred songs without a title (Augsburg: Philip Ulhart)
 Arnold Caussin – First book of motets for five voices (Venice: Antonio Gardano)
 Heinrich Faber – Beginner's music textbook  published in Nuremberg.
 Didier Lupi Second
First book of spiritual chansons for four voices (Lyon: Beringen & Beringen), all texts by Guillaume Guéroult
Third Book, containing 35 chansons for four voices (Lyon: Beringen & Beringen)
 Tugdual Menon –  for four voices (Ferrara: Giovanni de Buglhat & Antonio Hucher)
 Jan Nasco – Madrigals for five voices (Venice: Antonio Gardano)
 Dominique Phinot
Second book of motets for six, seven, and eight voices (Lyon: Godefroy & Marcellin Beringer)
First book of thirty-seven chansons (Lyon: Godefroy & Marcellin Beringer)
Second book containing thirty-six chansons (Lyon: Godefroy & Marcellin Beringer)
 Francesco Portinaro –  for five voices (Venice: Antonio Gardano)
 Cipriano de Rore –  (Third Book of Madrigals for Five Voices) published in Venice.

1549
 Gasparo Alberti – First book of masses (Venice: Girolamo Scotto), the first printed book of masses dedicated to a single Italian composer
 Paolo Aretino –  (Venice: Girolamo Scotto)
 Jacques Buus
Second book of ricercars (Venice: Antonio Gardano)
First book of motets for five voices (Venice: Antonio Gardano)
 Ghiselin Danckerts – Canons for four voices (Augsburg: Melchior Kriesstein)
 Nicolao Dorati – First book of madrigals for five voices (Venice: Antonio Gardano)
 Jhan Gero
 (Venice: Girolamo Scotto)
 (Venice: Girolamo Scotto)
 Claude Goudimel – book of chansons.
 Clement Janequin – 
 Didier Lupi Second – 30 Psalms for four voices (Lyon: Beringen & Beringen), French translations by Gilles D'Aurigny
 Hans Neusidler – 
 Giovanni Domenico da Nola – First book of motets for five voices (Venice: Girolamo Scotto)
 Caspar Othmayr
 (Nuremberg: Johann Berg & Ulrich Neuber)
 for four voices (Nuremberg: Johann Berg & Ulrich Neuber)
 Robert Wedderburn (probable) – The Complaynt of Scotland, including the earliest known references (in Middle Scots) to a number of Border ballads
 Gioseffo Zarlino –  – book of motets for 5 voices

Sacred music

1541
 Gasparo Alberti – Magnificat

1542
 Gasparo Alberti – Magnificat

1547
 Louis Bourgeois – published his first 4-voice psalms

Births

1540
 date unknown – Giovanni Maria Artusi, Italian composer and theorist (died 1613)
 probable – William Byrd, English composer (died 1623)
 probable – Jakob Regnart, Franco-Flemish composer (died 1599)
 probable – Girolamo Dalla Casa, Italian composer, cornetist and writer (died 1601)
 probable – William Daman, Flemish recorder player, organist and composer (died 1591)
 probable – Giovanni Dragoni, Italian composer (died 1598)
 probable – Noel Fagnient, Flemish composer and shopkeeper (died c.1600)
 probable – Johannes de Fossa, Flemish composer and choirmaster (died 1603)
 probable – Marcin Leopolita, Polish composer and musician (died c.1585)
 probable – Francesco Rovigo, Italian composer and organist (died 1597)
 probable – Alexander Utendal, Flemish singer, composer and choirmaster (died 1581)
 probable – Matthaus Waissel, German lutenist, composer, Lutheran theologian, publisher, schoolteacher and writer

1541
September 7 – Hernando de Cabezon, Spanish composer, publisher and editor (died 1602)
 probable – Vincenzo Bellavere, Italian composer and organist (died 1587)

1542
January 27 – Gioseffo Guami, Italian composer, organist, singer and teacher (died 1611)
February 22 – Santino Garsi da Parma, lutenist and composer (died 1604)
May 20 – Gasparo da Salo, Italian violin maker and double bass player (died 1609)
November 1 – Tarquinia Molza, Italian singer (died 1617)
probable – Cesare Bendinelli, Italian trumpeter (died 1617)
probable – Jakob Meiland, German composer, organist and choirmaster (died 1577)

1543
 Alfonso Ferrabosco the elder, Anglo-Italian composer (died 1588)
 Andreas Pevernage, Flemish composer and choirmaster (died 1591)
 Giovanni Maria Nanino, Italian composer, teacher, tenor and choirmaster (died 1607)

1544
 Maddelena Casulana, Italian composer, lutenist and singer. First female composer of the period to have her music printed and published.
 Ivo de Vento, Flemish composer and organist. Died 1575.

1545
October 19 – Giovenale Ancina – Italian priest and composer (died 1604)
 probable
Gioseppe Caimo, Italian composer and organist (died post 1584)
Luzzasco Luzzaschi, Ferrarese composer (died 1607)
Lodovico Balbi Italian composer, singer, choirmaster and Minorite friar (died 1604)
Antoine Barbe II Flemish organist and choirmaster (died 1604)
Gioseppe Caimo Italian composer and organist (died 1584)
Bernardo Clavijo del Castillo Spanish composer, organist, harpsichord player and teacher (died 1626)
Anthony Holborne English composer (died 1602)

1546
date unknown – Luca Bati, Italian composer (died 1608)

1547
Lucrezia Bendidio, Italian noblewoman and singer (died c.1584)
George de la Hele, Flemish composer (died 1586).
Manuel Mendes, Portuguese composer (died 1605).

1548
Gines Perez De La Parra, Spanish composer (died 1600).
Lambert de Sayve, Flemish singer and composer (died 1614).
Tomas Luis de Victoria, Spanish composer, singer, organist, priest and choirmaster (died 1611).

1549
December 9 – Costanzo Antegnati – Italian organ builder, organist, and composer
 date unknown – Kaspar Ulenberg, German theologian, poet, and composer (died 1617)
 – Eustache du Caurroy, French composer and singer (died 1609)
 – Giovanni de Macque, French composer, singer, organist and choirmaster (died 1614)

Deaths 
 1540: Francesco De Layolle, composer and organist (c.48)
 1541:
 Lupus Hellinck, Flemish composer (c.47)
 Hans Kotter, Organist and composer (c.56) died in Berne
 1542: Lodovico Fogliano, theorist and composer (c.66) died in Modena
 1543: probable
 Ludwig Senfl, Swiss composer (born c.1486)
 Francesco Canova da Milano, composer and lutenist
 Avery Burton, composer (c.73) died in England
 1544:
 Balthasar Resinarius, (c.58)
 Benedictus Dulcis, (c.52)
 1545: April 10 – Constanzo Festa, Italian composer (born c.1485–1490)
July 7 – William Crane, English composer, musician and merchant.
 Pietro Aaron, (c.65), composer, theorist and priest
 Sebastian z Felsztyna, (c.60), composer and theorist
 1546: October 18 – John Taverner, English composer (born c.1490)
 1547: October or November – John Redford, English composer, poet and playwright (born c. 1500)
 1548: June 14 – Elzéar Genet de Carpentras, French composer (born c. 1470)
 January 23 – Bernardo Pisano, Italian composer and singer (57)
 April 10 – Giacomo Fogliano, Italian composer, organist and teacher (born c.1468)
 August 16 – Georg Rhau, printer, publisher and composer, died in Wittenberg (c.60)
 October 21 – Sixt Dietrich, composer and teacher, died in St Gallen, Switzerland (c.55)
 Vincenzo Capirola, lutenist and composer, died in Brescia (c.74)
 1549: Richard Pygott, English composer and choirmaster

References

 
Music
16th century in music